Pipecuronium (Arduan) is a bisquaternary aminosteroid muscle relaxant which blocks nicotinic acetylcholine receptors at the neuromuscular junction. It is also an antagonist of M2 and M3 muscarinic receptors and is the most potent neuromuscular blocking agent of the aminosteroid class.

It is sold under the trade names Arduan and Pycuron.

See also
Pancuronium bromide

References 

Muscle relaxants
Quaternary ammonium compounds
Piperazines
Acetate esters
Bromides
Nicotinic antagonists
Androstanes